Procambarus barbiger, known as the Jackson prairie crayfish, is a species of crayfish in the family Cambaridae. It is endemic to Jackson Prairie in Newton County, Scott County, Jasper County, Smith County and Rankin County, Mississippi.

References

Cambaridae
Freshwater crustaceans of North America
Endemic fauna of Mississippi
Taxonomy articles created by Polbot
Crustaceans described in 1978
Taxa named by Joseph F. Fitzpatrick Jr.